The Non-Resident Violator Compact (NRVC) is a United States interstate compact used by 44 states and Washington, D.C. to process traffic citations across state borders.

When a motorist is cited in another member state and chooses not to respond to a moving violation (such as not paying a ticket), the other state notifies the driver's home state and the home state will suspend the driver's license until the driver takes care of the matter in the other state. The motorist whose home state is a member who incurs a moving violation in another state that is a member is released on their own recognizance with the promise to appear in court or pay the fine. In some member states, it is the responsibility of the motorist (if cited) to provide documented proof of compliance with the out-of-state ticket in a timely manner to avoid having home state driving privilege revoked.

Motorists cited for violations in a state that is not a member of the NRVC must post bail before being allowed to proceed. In addition, drivers licensed in a non-member state that are issued a citation in a member state will be processed normally. If the nonmember fails to pay the issued citation after being found guilty, the nonmember's privilege to drive in the ticket-issuing state will become suspended. Their home state license will remain unaffected.

Some states will not take action on offenses like vehicle equipment and vehicle inspection if their driver has ignored an out of state citation of those offenses. Out of state moving violations are the focus of the compact and there will be no differences in focus under the Driver License Agreement.

History

The Non-Resident Violator Compact came into existence in the 1970s, originating from the northeastern states. 

The Non-Resident Violator Compact is being superseded by the new Driver License Agreement (DLA) which also replaces the Driver License Compact. As planned by the DLC-NRVC Executive Board, when the Driver License Agreement is ratified by Non-Resident Violator Compact members, it will no longer be relevant.

Member states
 All states plus the District of Columbia are members except Alaska, California, Michigan, Montana, Oregon, and Wisconsin.

Notes
 Most states where a citation is issued will suspend your license in that state while you maintain the privilege to drive in your home state that is not a member of the NRVC
 Most states will also issue a warrant for your arrest as well as sending the suspension request to your home state.
 If you are traveling through NRVC member states, and you are licensed in one of the non-member states, it may be a good idea to carry enough cash to pay bond for any traffic violations you are stopped for and required to pay before leaving.

References

United States interstate compacts
Traffic law